The Soriya was the name given to the party from the mid-18th century that supported the successors of the war leader Ibrahim Sori first cousin of the jihad leader Karamoko Alfa  in the Imamate of Futa Jallon in what is now Guinea.

They contended with the clerical group, the Alfaya, who supported the successors of the jihad leader Karamoko Alfa. The rivalry between the two groups continued into the 20th century in Guinea.

References
Citations

Sources

Islam in Guinea
Defunct political parties in Guinea